Srimant Rajasri Rajaram Rajah Sahib Bhonsle Chhatrapati was the eldest son of Prathapasimha, the younger brother of Shivaji III of Thanjavur, by his first wife. He succeeded his uncle Shivaji III as the Senior Prince of Thanjavur and the head of the House of Bhonsle on the former's death.

References 

People of the Thanjavur Maratha kingdom